The women's handball tournament of the 1987 All-Africa Games were held in August 1987, in Nairobi, Kenya, contested by 8 national teams and won by Ivory Coast.

Draw

Preliminary round

Group A
Poule A
 , qualified for semi-finals
 , qualified for semi-finals
 
 ?
Amongst the results, Congo won 16–4 over Senegal

Group B

Knockout stage
Championship bracket

For the 5th rank, Algeria won 18-13 over Kenya.

Final ranking

Awards

References

Handball at the 1987 All-Africa Games
Women's handball in Kenya
Handball at the African Games
1987 in women's handball